The following is a list of living Australians who have been appointed Knights or Dames.

The list includes:
Knights and Dames of the Order of Australia
Knights and Dames of an Order of Chivalry under the British Imperial Honours system, including
Order of the British Empire
Royal Victorian Order
Order of St Michael and St George
Order of the Bath
Order of the Garter
Knights Bachelor (there is no female counterpart).

The list excludes Australian baronets.

Living Dames

Living Knights

Note 1: In 1981 as Prince of Wales, King Charles III was awarded a substantive knighthood of the Order of Australia (AK), despite not being an Australian. He has been the Sovereign Head of the Order of Australia since his accession to the throne on 8 September 2022.

See also
 Australian knights and dames, which includes both living and deceased persons
 Australian peers and baronets
 List of Knights and Dames of the Order of Australia
 Order of Australia
 Australian honours system
 Living New Zealand dames and knights

Notes

British honours system